Subasic may refer to:

 Subašić, South Slavic surname
 Šubašić, South Slavic surname